"Snow (Hey Oh)" (occasionally stylized as "Snow ((Hey Oh))") is a song by American band Red Hot Chili Peppers from their 2006 double album, Stadium Arcadium. The song was released as the follow-up single to "Tell Me Baby" on November 20, 2006, and became the band's third straight number one hit on the Billboard Modern Rock chart, a spot it held for five straight weeks. The single was their 11th to top that chart, giving the band the all-time record for any artist on that chart, a record they still hold to date and extended in 2016 to 13.

Vocalist Anthony Kiedis states that the track is "about surviving, starting fresh. I've made a mess of everything, but I have a blank slate—a canvas of snow—and I get to start over."

Background 
"Snow (Hey Oh)" is a characteristically soft, melodic song, much like those from the band's prior album By the Way. The song is driven by a rapid guitar riff by John Frusciante, and makes use of double stops on the bass by Flea. The song is written in the key of G# minor.

Reception 

Frusciante.net revealed that this was going to be the third of seven songs released as a single from Stadium Arcadium. Before even being released as a single, it climbed to #53 in the UK iTunes top 100 on May 13. Like its predecessor "Tell Me Baby", it peaked at #16 in the UK Singles Chart. On January 17, 2007, "Snow (Hey Oh)" became the band's record-breaking 11th number-one Modern Rock single in the United States and is the third consecutive chart-topping Modern Rock single from Stadium Arcadium. In Germany, it was the band's most successful song, reaching #5, making it the band's only Top-10-song there.

Music video 
In an interview, Tony Kaye, who also directed the video for "Dani California", told MTV he would be directing the video for the song. However, his footage wasn't used. Instead, Warner commissioned director Nick Wickham to shoot a new video showing the band at the October 17 and 18, 2006 shows at the Continental Airlines Arena in East Rutherford, New Jersey, along with black and white film of fans at the parking lot and lines at the live show.

Live performances 
"Snow (Hey Oh)" has been the second most performed song from Stadium Arcadium and has been performed over 250 times since 2006. On June 28, 2012, at the band's concert at Goffertpark in Nijmegen, Netherlands during the I'm with You Tour, the band performed the song for the first time since the end of the Stadium Arcadium Tour nearly five years earlier. As of 2023, the song is still featured regularly in the band's setlists.

Appearances 
In 2008 "Snow (Hey Oh)" was used as one of the official themes of WWE WrestleMania XXIV. It was also used in Scrubs in the two-part episode "My Finale" and during the end credits in Death Note: The Last Name. The song can be heard in a flashback scene in the Cold Case episode "Sabotage".

Track listings and formats 
CD single
"Snow (Hey Oh)" – 5:34
"Permutation" (Live) – 3:43

Maxi single 9362 42983-2
"Snow (Hey Oh)" – 5:34
"Funny Face" – 4:46
"I'll Be Your Domino" – 3:54

International CD single/7" picture disc 5439 15624-2
"Snow (Hey Oh)" – 5:34
"Funny Face" – 4:46

iTunes version single
"Snow (Hey Oh)" – 5:34
"Funny Face" – 4:46
"I'll Be Your Domino" – 3:54
"Permutation" (Live) – 3:43

Personnel 
Credits adapted from AllMusic.

Red Hot Chili Peppers
 Anthony Kiedis – lead vocals
 John Frusciante – guitars, backing vocals, keyboards, synthesizer, mellotron
 Flea – bass guitar, trumpet
 Chad Smith - drums, percussion

Additional musicians
 Greg Kurstin - Organ on "Funny Face"

Recording personnel
 Rick Rubin – production
 Andrew Scheps – mixing and engineering
 Ryan Hewitt – mixing and engineering
 Dana Nielsen – engineering
 Kevin Gray and Steve Hoffman – mastering (vinyl)
 Vlado Meller – mastering (CD)
 Matt Taylor  – design and art direction

Charts

Weekly charts

Year-end charts

Certifications and sales

References 

Red Hot Chili Peppers songs
Songs written by Flea (musician)
Songs written by John Frusciante
Songs written by Chad Smith
Songs written by Anthony Kiedis
2006 singles
Song recordings produced by Rick Rubin
2005 songs
Number-one singles in Hungary
Warner Records singles